The Greenwood Dodgers were a minor league baseball team, affiliated with the Brooklyn Dodgers that was based in Greenwood, Mississippi. They played in the Cotton States League and operated from 1934–1940 and 1947 and 1952. The team won the league championship in 1947.

The team originated when the Shreveport Sports moved to Greenwood and became the Greenwood Chiefs in 1934. They changed their names to the Greenwood Giants in 1937, Greenwood Dodgers in 1937, Greenwood Crackers in 1939, Greenwood Chocktaws in 1940 and finally back to the Dodgers after the WWII hiatus ended in 1947.

References

External links
History of baseball in Greenwood, Mississippi with pictures

Defunct minor league baseball teams
Defunct baseball teams in Mississippi
Brooklyn Dodgers minor league affiliates
New York Giants minor league affiliates
St. Louis Cardinals minor league affiliates
Detroit Tigers minor league affiliates
Baseball teams disestablished in 1952
Baseball teams established in 1947